Christiana mennegae is a species of flowering plant in the family Malvaceae. It is found only in Suriname.

References

Brownlowioideae
Flora of Suriname
Vulnerable plants
Taxonomy articles created by Polbot